The Sturgeon Bay east west Canal North Pierhead Light is a lighthouse located on Sturgeon Bay in Door County, Wisconsin.

Painted red, the light is situated on the north pier of the southern entrance to the Sturgeon Bay Ship Canal.

There are two lighthouses at this location, the other being the Sturgeon Bay Canal Lighthouse.

Gallery

Notes

References

Further reading

 Havighurst, Walter (1943) The Long Ships Passing: The Story of the Great Lakes, Macmillan Publishers.
 Oleszewski, Wes, Great Lakes Lighthouses, American and Canadian: A Comprehensive Directory/Guide to Great Lakes Lighthouses, (Gwinn, Michigan: Avery Color Studios, Inc., 1998) .
 
 Sapulski, Wayne S., (2001) Lighthouses of Lake Michigan: Past and Present (Paperback) (Fowlerville: Wilderness Adventure Books) ; .
 Wright, Larry and Wright, Patricia, Great Lakes Lighthouses Encyclopedia Hardback (Erin: Boston Mills Press, 2006) .

External links
Aerial photos of Sturgeon Bay Canal North Pierhead Light at Marinas.com.
Door County Lighthouses, Door County Marine Museum
Pepper, Terry, Seeing the light, Sturgeon Bay Canal North Pierhead Light (Archived May 17, 2021)
Lighthouse friends article
NPS Inventory of Historic Light Stations - Wisconsin (Archived October 9, 2012)
Satellite view at Google Maps

Lighthouses completed in 1903
Houses completed in 1903
Lighthouses in Door County, Wisconsin